Leticia López Landero (born 7 July 1962) is a Mexican politician affiliated with the PAN. She currently serves as Presidente Municipal Córdoba, Veracruz.

References

1962 births
Living people
Politicians from Veracruz
Women members of the Chamber of Deputies (Mexico)
Members of the Chamber of Deputies (Mexico)
National Action Party (Mexico) politicians
21st-century Mexican politicians
21st-century Mexican women politicians
Deputies of the LXII Legislature of Mexico